In human anatomy, the splenic artery or lienal artery is the blood vessel that supplies oxygenated blood to the spleen. It branches from the celiac artery, and follows a course superior to the pancreas. It is known for its tortuous path to the spleen.

Structure

The splenic artery gives off branches to the stomach and pancreas before reaching the spleen.

Note that the branches of the splenic artery do not reach all the way to the lower part of the greater curvature of the stomach. Instead, that region is supplied by the right gastroepiploic artery, a branch of the gastroduodenal artery. The two gastroepiploic arteries anastomose with each other at that point.

Relations
The splenic artery passes between the layers of the lienorenal ligament. Along its course, it is accompanied by a similarly named vein, the splenic vein, which drains into the hepatic portal vein.

Clinical significance

Splenic artery aneurysms are rare, but still the third most common abdominal aneurysm, after aneurysms of the abdominal aorta and iliac arteries. They may occur in pregnant women in the third trimester and rupture carries a maternal mortality of greater than 50% and a fetal mortality of 70 to 90%. Risk factors include smoking and hypertension. For the treatment of patients who represent a high surgical risk, percutaneous endovascular treatment may be considered.

Additional images

References

Abbas MA, Stone WM, Fowl RJ, Gloviczki P, Oldenburg WA, Pairolero PC, Hallett JW, Bower TC, Panneton JM, Cherry KJ (2002)."Splenic arterya neurysms: two decades experience at Mayo clinic". Ann Vasc Surg. 16(4): 442-449. 
 Jamsheer NS, Malik M (2001). "Ruptured splenic artery aneurysm". Ann Saudi Med.  21(5-6): pp. 340–341. Accessed July 30, 2005.
Pauletto R, Mieres J, Incarbone A, García A, Santaera O (2013). "Exclusión de aneurisma esplénico gigante con técnica de catéteres mother-in-child en paciente de alto riesgo quirúrgico". Revista Argentina de Cardioangiología Vol. 4(1): pp. 62–65, Buenos Aires (Argentina): Colegio Argentino de Cardioangiología Intervencionista. ISSN 2313-9307, retrieved 11 September 2013.
Suzuki K, Prates JC, DiDio LJ (1978)."Incidence and surgical importance of the posterior gastricartery", Ann. Surg. 187(2): 134-136.
Pauletto R, Mieres J, Incarbone A, García A, Santaera O (2013). "Exclusión de aneurisma esplénico gigante con técnica de catéteres mother-in-child en paciente de alto riesgo quirúrgico". Revista Argentina de Cardioangiología Vol. 4(1): pp. 62–65, Buenos Aires (Argentina): Colegio Argentino de Cardioangiología Intervencionista. ISSN 2313-9307, retrieved 11 September 2013.

External links
Ruptured splenic artery aneurysm - a case report from Saudi Arabia.
Splenic artery - medterms.com
  - "Stomach, Spleen and Liver: The Splenic Artery"
 
 

Arteries of the abdomen